Kuala Pilah (Negeri Sembilan Malay: Kolo Pilah), or simply Pilah, is a town in Kuala Pilah District, Negeri Sembilan, Malaysia.

Townscape
Kuala Pilah is an old valley town with many of the pre-war Chinese shop houses still fronting the main streets surrounded by traditional style Malay village houses built on stilts nestled among extensive rice fields. It has a sizeable Chinese community that has existed since the mining days during the early British rule. This community today engages in trading and providing essential services such as workshops, hairdressing and coffee shops.

The town is especially busy on weekends due to the flood of folks returning from Kuala Lumpur, usually to visit their parents or to tend to their family plots, where around the area is mostly Malays that migrated to Kuala Lumpur in search of better prospects and 'the bright lights'. The town is quite empty at night as most of the shops close as early as 7.00 pm daily. But early mornings are busy as workers and residents were staying nearby going to work at government offices such as hospitals, district offices and schools.

There are not many food stalls around, most are limited to the junction between Kuala Pilah and Bahau. The town used to have a movie theatre, but it was closed due to the introduction of video and internet cafes that sprouted during the 1990s. Those cafes are still going strong today.

The town is where one can also find the old Kuala Pilah Rest House, which was built by the government during the British occupation. In the early years, rest houses were the only available hotels and where everyone from businessmen to travellers stayed. It still serves this purpose today, albeit in a diminished capacity due to the availability of alternative accommodations.

Politics
Currently, Kuala Pilah is represented in the Dewan Rakyat of the Malaysian Parliament by Dato' Seri Eddin Syazlee Shith of PPBM, a component party of the federal ruling coalition Perikatan Nasional. 

In turn, Kuala Pilah provides five seats to the Negeri Sembilan State Legislative Assembly, namely:
 Juasseh;
 Seri Menanti, the royal town;
 Senaling;
 Pilah, which included downtown Kuala Pilah; and
 Johol.

Four state seats are currently held by UMNO save for downtown Kuala Pilah, which is held by PKR.

Healthcare

Public hospitals
 Hospital Tuanku Ampuan Najihah, located at the main road towards Seremban (Federal Route 51).

Tourist attractions

Ulu Bendul Recreation
Situated 16 km from Seremban on the way to Kuala Pilah / Sri Menanti, this recreation garden is surrounded by mountains an ideal spot to relax away from the bustling town. Lying near the foot of the 2500 ft Mount Angsi, fresh water from the streams flows into the man-made lake. This recreational park was built in 1972 and is located at compartments 45 and 52 of the Angsi Forest Reserve (Hutan Simpan Angsi) in Negeri Sembilan. Located 200 m above sea level, the forest is categorised as the main attraction here with the summit reaching to 825 m above sea level. There are long-cabin for mountain climbers, tracks for hikers and jungle paths for the adventures.

The Martin Lister memorial
On the main road is a Chinese-styled arch dedicated to Martin Lister, who was the first British Resident of Negeri Sembilan, commemorating his effort in ending the intermittent violent conflict between Chinese secret societies then rampant among the migrant Chinese populace. Lister was killed by his enemies in the nearby hills at Ulu Bendul.

Transportation
The town itself serves as the main stopover point for transport routes.

Car
Kuala Pilah is perhaps being famous for being an important rest town for travellers using Federal Route 9, which runs through downtown Kuala Pilah. This highway, beginning in Tampin near the Negeri Sembilan-Malacca border and ending in Karak in western Pahang, is the main route for motorists from Malacca and Negeri Sembilan heading to the east coast states of Pahang, Terengganu and Kelantan while bypassing Kuala Lumpur/the Klang Valley.

Meanwhile, Kuala Pilah is connected to the state capital, Seremban by Federal Route 51.

Bus
There are a new Bus Station and Taxi Stand located in the middle of Kuala Pilah Town and services to Seremban, Kuala Lumpur, Tampin, Bahau and Gemas are available—also to the East Coast towns of Kuantan and Kuala Terengganu. People from Segamat and parts of Pahang use this route through Kuala Pilah to go to Kuala Lumpur via Seremban.

Train
There used to be a branch line connecting Kuala Pilah to Bahau; the branch line was closed in 1931 due to the Great Depression; the tracks were soon dismantled.

Currently state railway operator KTMB does not serve Kuala Pilah. The closest stations are  Seremban, Bahau and Senawang.

Notable natives
 Ghafar Baba, Deputy Prime Minister (1986-1993)
 Rosmah Mansor, the second wife of former Prime Minister of Malaysia, Najib Razak
 Shamsiah Fakeh, communist activist and leader of Angkatan Wanita Sedar

References

Kuala Pilah District
Towns in Negeri Sembilan